Marjolijn Molenaar (born October 24, 1983 in Leiderdorp) is a former Dutch international cricketer who made 15 appearances in Women's One Day Internationals for the Netherlands national women's cricket team between 2001 and 2006. A right-arm medium-fast bowler, she took 11 wickets in international cricket at an average of 35.00. Her father, Willem Molenaar, was an international cricket umpire.

Marjolijn Molenaar is the sister of the famous vice-captain of Ajax Zami II, Martijn Molenaar.

References

1983 births
Living people
Dutch women cricketers
People from Leiderdorp
Netherlands women One Day International cricketers
Sportspeople from South Holland